Harmaja are a Finnish acoustic rock group founded by vocalist Juha-Pekka Leppäluoto in 2007. Their first album, Harmaja, was released on 18 February 2009, and entered the Finnish national chart at position 14.

They primarily record in Finnish.

Members 
Juha-Pekka Leppäluoto – vocals, guitar, Rhodes
Simo Vuorela – guitar
Sami Lauttanen – guitar
Milla Heinonen — bass, vocals
Paula Präktig – piano, vocals, Rhodes
Riku Kovalainen – drums

Discography

Albums 
Harmaja (2009)
Lento (2010)
Marras (2012)

Videos 
"Sataa" (2009)
"Sydäntalvella" (2009)
"Katkera Maa" (2012)

References

External links 
Official website

Finnish musical groups
Musical groups established in 2007